This article is about the demographic features of the population of Mauritius, including population density, ethnicity, education level, the health of the populace, economic status, religious affiliations, and other aspects of the population.

Mauritian society includes people from many different ethnic groups as well as a significant population of mixed-race people who have ancestry from more than one ethnic group. A majority of the republic's residents are the descendants of people from India. Mauritius also contains substantial populations from continental Africa, China, France ,and the East African island nation of Madagascar.

Ethnic groups
Indo-Mauritians make up approximately sixty-six percent of the population. The Indo-Mauritian population consists of Hindu and Muslim and Christian descendants of Indian laborers.

Mauritian Creoles (descendants of Africans) make up twenty-eight percent of the population. Today, a significant proportion of Creoles are of African descent with varying amounts of French and Indian ancestry. The creole community also includes the country's ‘Metisse’ or mixed-race communities which consist of people with any admixture of the island's other groups. Rodrigues and Chagossians are usually incorporated within the Creole ethnic group.

Franco-Mauritians (Mauritians of French ancestry) form around two percent of the population. They are descendants of French settlers, comprising the largest group of European origin. There is a smaller population of British descent, most of whom have been absorbed into the Franco-Mauritian community. There is also a considerable number of white foreign expatriates living in Mauritius, about 8,000 from France and 2,000 from South Africa. Along with the French European community, there is a small number of British expatriates or people of British descent in Mauritius.

Sino-Mauritians from the Hakka and other Chinese sub-ethnic/linguistic groups make up around three percent of Mauritian society.

While the government officially groups Mauritians in four ethnic groups –  Hindus, Muslims, Chinese, and General Population – the general population includes all who do not practice the Hindu or Muslim religion or are not Chinese by ethnicity. Hence the general population is the Christian community, which includes Creoles, mixed people, white people, and those who have converted to Christianity. The exception is that the general population does not include the Christian Chinese, although most practice a mix of Christianity and traditional Chinese religions.

Small groups of foreign students from Europe or the Indian Ocean region are also present. Recent years have seen a steady flow of foreign workers into the textile industry (primarily Chinese women), the construction industry (primarily Indian workers), and harbor-related activities (primarily Taiwanese men). Immigration policy does not provoke much debate in Mauritius, and the relative economic stability of the island serves to attract foreign workers.

Population

The proportion of the population aged under 15 was 21.9% in 2010. 71.2% were between 15 and 65 years of age, with 6.9% being 65 years or older.

Structure of the population 

Structure of the population (01.07.2012) (Estimates based on the results of the 2011 Population Census) :

Structure of the population (04.07.2019) (Census, complete tabulation):

Vital statistics 
Mauritius has an estimated population of 1,283,415 on December 31, 2010. 14,701 children were born in 2011 (birth rate 11.4 per 1,000).

The table below presents the population development of Mauritius since 1900. The figure up to 1945 are for the island of Mauritius only. As of 1946 the island of Rodrigues is included.

Figures from Statistics Mauritius and United Nations Demographic Yearbook.

Life expectancy

Language

The main languages spoken in Mauritius are English, French, Mauritian Creole, and Bhojpuri. There is no official language. English is the official language of the parliament, though French is also permitted. However, the lingua franca is Mauritian Creole and the newspapers and television programs are usually in French. The Mauritian currency displays English, Tamil and Bhojpuri languages.

Mauritian Creole, which is spoken by 90 percent of the population, is considered to be the native language of the country and is used most often in informal settings. It was developed in the 18th century by African slaves who used a pidgin language to communicate with each other as well as with their French masters, who did not understand the various African languages. The pidgin evolved with later generations to become a casual language.

Mauritian Creole is a French-based creole.

Religion

In 2015, the population was estimated to be 48.5% Hindu, 27.2% Roman Catholic, 17.5% Muslim, 3.9% No religion and unspecified, 2.5% Protestantism, 0.4% Other religions.

More than 90% of the Sino-Mauritian community are Christian; the remainder are largely Buddhist.

Migrants

According to the United Nations, there were 28,713 international migrants in Mauritius in 2017.

Their most common countries of origin were as follows:

Other demographic statistics 
Demographic statistics according to the World Population Review in 2022.

One birth every 41 minutes	
One death every 46 minutes	
One net migrant every Infinity minutes	
Net gain of one person every 360 minutes

The following demographics are from the CIA World Factbook unless otherwise indicated.

Population
1,308,222 (2022 est.)
1,364,283 (July 2018 est.)

Religions
Hindu 48.5%, Christian 32.7%, Muslim 17.3%, other 0.6%, none 0.7%, unspecified 0.1% (2011 Census)

Age structure

0-14 years: 19.44% (male 137,010/female 131,113)
15-24 years: 14.06% (male 98,480/female 95,472)
25-54 years: 43.11% (male 297,527/female 297,158)
55-64 years: 12.31% (male 80,952/female 88,785)
65 years and over: 11.08% (2020 est.) (male 63,230/female 89,638)

0-14 years: 19.9% (male 138,707 /female 132,774)
15-24 years: 14.52% (male 100,281 /female 97,836)
25-54 years: 43.6% (male 297,558 /female 297,243)
55-64 years: 11.81% (male 76,620 /female 84,554)
65 years and over: 10.17% (male 57,094 /female 81,616) (2018 est.)

Median age
total: 36.3 years. Country comparison to the world: 80th
male: 35 years
female: 37.6 years (2020 est.)

total: 35.7 years. Country comparison to the world: 77th
male: 34.5 years 
female: 36.7 years (2018 est.)

Birth rate
9.86 births/1,000 population (2022 est.) Country comparison to the world: 190th
12.8 births/1,000 population (2018 est.) Country comparison to the world: 152nd

Death rate
8.86 deaths/1,000 population (2022 est.) Country comparison to the world: 64th
7.1 deaths/1,000 population (2018 est.) Country comparison to the world: 127th

Total fertility rate
1.35 children born/woman (2022 est.) Country comparison to the world: 218th
1.74 children born/woman (2018 est.) Country comparison to the world: 163rd
1.80 children born/woman (2010 est.)
2.02 children born/woman (2000 est.)

Population growth rate
0.1% (2022 est.) Country comparison to the world: 188th
0.57% (2018 est.) Country comparison to the world: 150th
0.776% (2010 est.)

Contraceptive prevalence rate
63.8% (2014)

Net migration rate
0 migrant(s)/1,000 population (2022 est.) Country comparison to the world: 92nd

Life expectancy at birth
total population: 74.86 years. Country comparison to the world: 131st
male: 72.04 years
female: 77.88 years (2022 est.)

total population: 76 years (2018 est.)
male: 72.6 years (2018 est.)
female: 79.7 years (2018 est.)

Infant mortality rate
9.5 deaths/1,000 live births (2018 est.)
12.2 deaths/1,000 live births (2010 est.)
17.73 deaths/1,000 live births (2000 est.)

Dependency ratios
total dependency ratio: 41.6 (2015 est.)
youth dependency ratio: 27.5 (2015 est.)
elderly dependency ratio: 14.1 (2015 est.)
potential support ratio: 7.1 (2015 est.)

Urbanization
urban population: 40.8% of total population (2022)
rate of urbanization: 0.28% annual rate of change (2020-25 est.)

Nationality
noun:
Mauritian(s)
adjective:
Mauritian

Ethnic groups
Mauritians of Indian Origin 65.8%,
Mauritians of African Origin 27.7%, Mauritians of Chinese Origin 3%, Mauritians of French Origin 2%

Languages
As mother tongue: Mauritian Creole 86.8%, Bhojpuri 5%, French 4.1%, Two languages 1.4%, Other 2.6%, Unspecified 0.1% (2011 est.)

As ancestral languages: Hindi 33.5%, Urdu 17.3%, Tamil 6%, Chinese 3%, Telugu 2%, Marathi 2%

Sex ratio
at birth
1 male(s)/female
under 15 years:
1.03 male(s)/female
15–64 years:
0.99 male(s)/female
65 years and over:
0.67 male(s)/female
total population:
0.98 male(s)/female (2000 est.)

Education expenditures
4.6% of GDP (2020) Country comparison to the world: 80th

Literacy
definition: age 15 and over can read and write (2016 est.)
total population: 91.3%
male: 93.4%
female: 89.4% (2018)

total population: 93.2% (2016 est.)
male: 95.4% (2016 est.)
female: 91% (2016 est.)

School life expectancy (primary to tertiary education)
total: 15 years (2017)
male: 14 years (2017)
female: 16 years (2017)

Unemployment, youth ages 15–24
total: 21.8%
male: 16.8%
female: 28.4% (2019 est.)

References

Further reading

External links 
 

 
Demographics